Umberto Zanotti Bianco (22 January 1889 – 28 August 1963) was an Italian historian social activist. He was once President of the Italian Red Cross.

Career 
In 1920, Umberto Zanotti Bianco founded the Società Magna Grecia. In 1955, he co-founded the Italian patrimonial non-profit Italia Nostra along with Pietro Paolo Trompeo, Giorgio Bassani, Desideria Pasolini dall'Onda, Elena Croce, Luigi Magnani, and Hubert Howard,

References

External links 
Associazione Nazionale per gli Interessi del Mezzogiorno d'Italia

1889 births
1963 deaths
Italian archaeologists
Italian life senators
20th-century archaeologists